Willisville is an unincorporated community in Washington Township, Pike County, in the U.S. state of Indiana.

History
An old variant name of the community was called Clark.

Geography

References

Unincorporated communities in Pike County, Indiana
Unincorporated communities in Indiana